S.S.C. Napoli spent the 2001-02 season in Serie B, which had been assured following sensational events in the final Serie A round the season before, when all bottom teams won their matches. In 2002, Napoli came fairly close to promotion, but stumbled due to a 2-1 defeat to Siena at the end of the campaign. With Empoli rounding off their campaign with a victory, not even a win could have helped Napoli to have a chance, and with the team also losing the final game of the season, Luigi De Canio stepped down as coach.

Squad

Goalkeepers
  Marco Roccati
  Raffaele Gragnaniello
  Francesco Mancini

Defenders
  Dario Baccin
  Antonio Bocchetti
  Mauro Bonomi
  Ciro Caruso
  Esteban López
  Gianluca Luppi
  Marco Quadrini
  Abdelilah Saber
  Emanuele Troise
  Matteo Villa

Midfielders
  Giuseppe Alessi
  Raffaele Ametrano
  Emiliano Bigica
  Domenico Cristiano
  Marek Jankulovski
  Oscar Magoni
  Montezine
  Francesco Moriero
  José Luís Vidigal

Attackers
  Antonio Floro Flores
  Roberto Stellone
  Mattia Graffiedi
  Carlos Pavón
  Massimo Rastelli
  Edoardo Artistico
  David Sesa

Serie B

Matches

S.S.C. Napoli seasons
Napoli